Baby Face is a 1933 American pre-Code drama film directed by Alfred E. Green for Warner Bros., starring Barbara Stanwyck as Lily Powers, and featuring George Brent. Based on a story by Darryl F. Zanuck (under the pseudonym Mark Canfield), Baby Face portrays an attractive young woman who uses sex to advance her social and financial status. Twenty-five-year-old John Wayne appears briefly as one of Powers's lovers.

Marketed with the salacious tagline "She had it and made it pay", the film's open discussion of sex made it one of the most notorious films of the Pre-Code Hollywood era and helped bring the era to a close as enforcement of the code became stricter beginning in 1934. Mark A. Vieira, author of Sin in Soft Focus: Pre-Code Hollywood  has said, "Baby Face was certainly one of the top 10 films that caused the Production Code to be enforced." In 2005, Baby Face was included in the annual selection of 25 motion pictures to be added to the National Film Registry of the Library of Congress.

Plot
Lily Powers, an attractive, young woman, works for her father, Nick, in a speakeasy in Erie, Pennsylvania, during Prohibition. Her father has been prostituting her to his customers since she was 14 years old. An influential politician threatens to have the speakeasy shut down after Lily refuses to have sex with him. Nick berates Lily for rejecting him. Lily then tells Nick she's moving out and that she'll hate him forever for forcing her to have sex with strangers. Minutes later Nick is killed in an explosion while repairing his burning still.

After her father's funeral, Lily visits Cragg, an old cobbler and the only man she trusts. She tells him she was offered a job as a stripper at a local burlesque club. Cragg disapproves and encourages her to adopt Friedrich Nietzsche's philosophy of exerting one's  personal power over others to get what one wants. In Lily's case, that means using her sexuality to exploit men financially rather than allowing men to exploit her sexually.

Later she and her best friend, a young  Black woman named Chico who was her co-worker at the speakeasy,  illegally board a freight train to New York City but are discovered by a railroad worker. He threatens to report them to the police but Lily seduces him and the two women remain on the train.

In Manhattan, Lily seeks work at Gotham Trust, a large international bank. She seduces the personnel worker to land a clerical job. In the filing department, Lily begins an affair with Jimmy McCoy Jr., who recommends her for promotion to his boss, Brody. She easily seduces Brody, and he promotes her to the mortgage department. Later, Brody and Lily are caught having sex in the ladies' room by a rising young executive, Ned Stevens. Ned fires Brody on the spot. Lily then falsely claims that Brody forced himself on her and that she was afraid of losing her job if she resisted. Ned believes her and he gives her a position in his accounting department.

Ned is engaged to Ann Carter, the daughter of First Vice President J. P. Carter. Despite this, Lily seduces Ned as well. When Ann calls Ned's office to say she will be visiting, Lily arranges to have Ann see her embracing Ned. Ann runs crying to her father, who tells Ned to fire Lily. Ned refuses so J.P. advises Ned to take a vacation and kindly offers to handle the situation. J. P. calls Lily to his office to fire her. Lily claims she had no idea Ned was engaged and that he was her first boyfriend. Lily salvages her situation by seducing J. P. and he installs her in a lavish apartment with Chico as her maid. Ned, who is now in love with Lily, quits the bank and breaks off his engagement with Ann. He then tracks Lily down on Christmas Day but she spurns him. He later returns to her apartment to propose but finds J. P. there. He shoots J.P. to death and then shoots himself and dies.

Courtland Trenholm, the grandson of Gotham Trust's founder and a notorious playboy, is elected bank president to handle the resulting scandal. The board of directors learns Lily has agreed to sell her diary to the press for $10,000 which includes the stories of her multiple office affairs. Consequently, the board members summon her to their meeting room. She tells them she is a victim of circumstance and wants to move far away, change her name and earn an honest living. The board considers giving her $15,000 to withhold her diary. Courtland, however, sees through her ruse and instead offers her a position at the bank's  Paris branch and to pay for her travel expenses. She reluctantly accepts and later changes her name.

When Courtland travels to Paris on business, he is impressed to find Lily promoted to head of the travel bureau. He takes her out for dinner and later invites her to travel with him. He falls in love with her during their vacation. Lily suggests marriage and Courtland agrees. Lily then moves back to New York with her new husband. 

Soon afterwards, the bank fails due to mismanagement which the board unfairly pins on Courtland. He is  indicted and tells Lily he must raise money to finance his legal defense. He therefore asks her to return all the bonds, stocks and jewelry he's given her. She refuses, saying that would impoverish her. She then leaves and books passage on a ship back to Paris. However, she reconsiders while waiting for her ship to leave port. 

She deboards and searches for Courtland. She finds him in his office where he has shot himself in the abdomen but is still alive. She tearfully professes her love for him and tells him he can have all of her money. During the ambulance ride, a paramedic assures her Courtland will likely survive. Lily accidentally drops her jewelry case, spilling money and jewels on the floor. When the paramedic points this out, she tearfully tells him they do not matter anymore. Courtland opens his eyes and sees Lily.

Cast

 Barbara Stanwyck as Lily Powers
 George Brent as Courtland Trenholm
 Donald Cook as Ned Stevens
 Alphonse Ethier as Adolf Cragg, a cobbler
 Henry Kolker as J. P. Carter
 Margaret Lindsay as Ann Carter
 Arthur Hohl as Ed Sipple
 John Wayne as Jimmy McCoy Jr., one of Lily's early bank conquests

 Robert Barrat as Nick Powers, Lily's father
 Douglass Dumbrille as Brody 
 Theresa Harris as Chico, Lily's friend and maid
 Charles Coleman as Hodges (uncredited) 
 Nat Pendleton as Stolvich (uncredited)
 Harry Tenbrook as laborer (uncredited) 
 Edward Van Sloan as Jameson, Bank Director (uncredited)
 Harry Wilson as laborer (uncredited)

Production
This film was Warner Bros.' answer to MGM's Red-Headed Woman (1932) starring Jean Harlow, another pre-Code Hollywood film with a similar theme. Production head Darryl F. Zanuck wrote the treatment for the film and sold it to Warner Bros. for a dollar. The Great Depression was having a devastating effect on the film industry at the time, and many studio personnel were voluntarily taking salary cuts to help. Zanuck did not need the money because he was drawing a weekly salary of $3,500. He later left Warner Bros. and became the head of production at 20th Century Fox.

Aside from its depiction of a seductress, the film is notable for the "comradely" relationship Lily has with African-American Chico, who is her co-worker in Erie, Pennsylvania, and comes with her to New York City.  She later becomes Stanwyck's maid, but their relationship remains friendly, and not that of a mistress and her servant.  When Lily's father tries to fire Chico, Lily tells him that if Chico goes, she goes. At one point in the film, J.P., annoyed by Chico's singing (“St. Louis Blues”—see below) says,  "I wish you'd get rid of that fantastic colored girl,”  to which Lily responds, with grim finality, "No. Chico stays."

Stanwyck had influence on the film's script.  It was her suggestion that Lily had been forced by her father to have sex with the customers of his speakeasy.

Baby Face was shot in 18 days, and cost $187,000.

A publicity still from this film aptly shows Barbara Stanwyck posing next to a stepladder, representing Lily's step-by-step up the ladder of success, as she seduces one man after another.

Music
An instrumental version of the 1926 hit song "Baby Face", composed by Harry Akst, is played over the opening credits and in later scenes. However, the soundtrack is dominated by an instrumental version of  "Saint Louis Blues"  by W. C. Handy, particularly when Lily is working on her latest victim. This theme plays as the camera pans from floor to floor on a model of the bank building as she works her way up through the ranks. Theresa Harris sings lines and phrases from “St. Louis Blues” in character as “Chico" throughout the film, and a triumphant brass finish plays at the close of the final scene. Ralph Erwin's “I Kiss Your Hand Madame”, from the 1929 film of the same name, serves as the theme for the romance between Lily and Trenholm.

Censorship
After its initial limited release, the Hays Office recommended that the film be pulled from distribution entirely because of multiple violations of the Production Code.  Extensive correspondence took place between Zanuck and Jack L. Warner of Warner Bros. and the Association of Motion Picture Producers (AMPP) about ways to make the film more acceptable to state and city censors.  The primary change was to alter the ending to one which showed Lily losing everything and returning to her roots in her home town, where she is content to live a modest lifestyle, thus showing the audience that her sexual vices were not ultimately rewarded.  Also, Lily's status as a "kept woman" was made less obvious, and the scene where she seduces a railroad worker in a boxcar, while her friend Chico is on the other side of the car, singing "Saint Louis Blues", was cut.

Another significant change was that the cobbler's enthusiasm for Nietzschean philosophy was replaced by his becoming the moral voice of the film, showing that Lily had been wrong to use her body to succeed. The cobbler's original speech was:

The altered version, with the cobbler as the voice of morality, was:

The new lines were dubbed onto an over-the-shoulder shot of the cobbler.

The New York State Censorship Board rejected the film's original version in April 1933, and Warners made the changes described above, as well as cutting some sexually suggestive shots. In June 1933, the Board passed the revised version, which then had a successful release.  The film was also initially rejected by the censorship board in Virginia.

The uncensored version remained lost until 2004, when it resurfaced at a Library of Congress film vault in Dayton, Ohio. George Willeman is credited with the discovery. The restored version premiered at the London Film Festival in November 2004. In 2005, it was deemed "culturally, historically, or aesthetically significant" and selected for preservation in the United States Library of Congress National Film Registry and also was named by Time magazine as one of the 100 best movies of the last 80 years. Turner Classic Movies shows the uncensored version.

Reception

Box office
According to Warner Bros., the film earned $308,000 domestically and $144,000 foreign.

Critical response
Reviews contemporary with the film's release were not positive. Mordaunt Hall in The New York Times panned the film, calling it "an unsavory subject, with incidents set forth in an inexpert fashion," while a review in The New York Evening Post said "You cannot escape the belief that Lily is a vixen of the lowest order and that the men who play with her are doomed to perish in the flames."

Modern reviews are more appreciative: Ty Burr of The Boston Globe called it "a fascinatingly conflicted artifact of Depression-era do-me feminism. Lily Powers is one of the screen's great hard girls, and "Baby Face" can't decide whether to celebrate her or string her along." Mick La Salle, movie critic for the San Francisco Chronicle, said "The differences between the original and the release versions of "Baby Face" are small, and yet combined they spell the difference between a good three-star movie and a delightful four-star movie."

See also
 Pre-Code sex films
 List of rediscovered films

References
Notes

Bibliography
 Doherty, Thomas Patrick (1999) Pre-Code Hollywood: Sex, Immorality, and Insurrection in American Cinema 1930–1934. New York: Columbia University Press;

External links

Baby Face essay by Gwendolyn Audrey Foster at National Film Registry 
Baby Face essay by Daniel Eagan in America's Film Legacy: The Authoritative Guide to the Landmark Movies in the National Film Registry, A&C Black, 2010 , pages 213-215 

 
 
 
 Review by Chris Dashiell from July 2000 (pre-restoration)
 Blog entry from Filmradar.com, May 20, 2005
 Article by Kendahl Cruver, Senses of Cinema, September 2005
 "Revealing the Racy Original Cut of 'Babyface'", Scott Simon, January 29, 2005
 "Profile and Review: Forbidden Hollywood", Review by J.C. Loophole, The Shelf

1930s American films
1930s English-language films
1933 films
1933 drama films
American black-and-white films
American drama films
Films about businesspeople
Films about social class
Films directed by Alfred E. Green
Films set in New York City
Films set in Paris
Films with screenplays by Kathryn Scola
Murder–suicide in films
Rediscovered American films
United States National Film Registry films
Warner Bros. films